The 1955 Divizia B was the 16th season of the second tier of the Romanian football league system.

The format has been maintained to three series, one of them having 14 teams and two of them only 13. At the end of the season the winners of the series promoted to Divizia A, the last four places from the first and third series and the last five places from the second series relegated to Divizia C. This was the sixth season played in the spring-autumn system, a system imposed by the new leadership of the country which were in close ties with the Soviet Union.

Team changes

To Divizia B
Promoted from District Championship
 Avântul Fălticeni
 Locomotiva Galați
 Metalul 108 Cugir
 Metalul Arad
 Știința București
 Știința Craiova

Relegated from Divizia A
 Metalul Hunedoara
 Locomotiva GR București
 Metalul Câmpia Turzii
 Progresul Oradea

From Divizia B
Relegated to District Championship
 Flacăra Pitești
 Constructorul Arad
 Locomotiva Pașcani
 Locomotiva Oradea
 Constructorul Craiova
 Metalul Brăila

Promoted to Divizia A
 Progresul FB București
 Avântul Reghin
 Locomotiva Constanța

Renamed teams 
Metalul Câmpina was renamed as Flacăra Câmpina.

Metalul Ploiești was renamed as Flacăra 1 Mai Ploiești.

Spartac Burdujeni was renamed as Flamura Roșie Burdujeni.

Spartac Focșani was renamed as Progresul Focșani.

Voința București was renamed as Progresul CPCS București.

League tables

Serie I

Serie II

Serie III

See also 

 1955 Divizia A

References

Liga II seasons
Romania
Romania
2
2